Nevinnomyssk is a city in Stavropol Krai, Russia, located on both banks of the Kuban River at its confluence with the Bolshoy Zelenchuk River,  south of Stavropol.

The only single-industry town in Stavropol Krai. Since December 22, 2017 year — the territory of advanced socio-economic development.

On October 29, 2020, the Duma of the Stavropol territory decided to award the honorary title «City of military valor».

On December 14, 2019, residents of the city on the bridge set a world record for "The Largest number of people simultaneously standing in the plank in the world". Within 1 minute in plank there were 4573 people.

History
Nevinnomyssk was founded in 1825 as a stanitsa near a small fort. It was granted town status in 1939. Nevinnomyssk was occupied by the Germans from August 1942-January/February 1943 in Operation Case Blue, connected to Operation Edelweiss.

Administrative and municipal status
Within the framework of administrative divisions, it is incorporated as the city of krai significance of Nevinnomyssk— an administrative unit with the status equal to that of the districts. As a municipal division, the city of krai significance of Nevinnomyssk is incorporated as Nevinnomyssk Urban Okrug.

Authorities 
The structure of local self-government bodies in the city consists of:
 City Duma-city body;
 head of a city-the head of a municipality who heads the city administration;
 city administration — Executive and administrative body of the city;
 control and accounting chamber of the city.
Chapter of city
 Anatoly Semenchenko;
 Viktor Ledovsky;
 Konstantin Khramov
 V. O. from March to July 2012 — Tatyana Vasilchenko;
 from July 2012 to April 21, 2015 — Sergey Batynyuk;
 from April 21, 2015, to November 16, 2016 — Nadezhda Bogdanova;
 since November 16, 2016 — Michael Minenkov. 
Heads Of Administration:
 until April 2015-Sergey Batynyuk;
 from May 29, 2015 to November 2016-Vasily Shestak.
 Since November 2016, the post of head of Administration is combined by the head of the city.
Chairman of the city Duma
 Alexander Medyanik.

Modern technology 
Nevinnomyssk is actively implementing the Smart city system. To date, several modules from the "smart city"  system are successfully operating in the city. Among them-the program complex "Urbanix", which provides the cartographic basis of Nevinnomyssk, as well as "smart lighting", created under the energy service contract, and the video surveillance system "Safe city".

There are plans to install "smart stops" and a number of other innovations.

Also on the outskirts of Nevinnomyssk, a huge wind Park started operating.

This is 84 wind power plants generating 2.5 MW each. Thus, the total capacity of the wind farm is 210 MW. Similar modern technologies are used in EU countries.

Culture 

 Gorky city Palace of Culture.
 Rodina cultural and leisure center.
 Central city library.
 Nevinnomyssk Museum of local history. The Museum was established in May 1957. The initiators were veterans of the civil and great Patriotic wars. The Museum has three halls-an exhibition hall ("a look into the past. About the history of the city "" and two exhibitions.
 Parks of culture and recreation cities of Nevinnomyssk

Transport 

Nevinnomyssk railway station accepts commuter and long-distance passenger trains. The city moved modern buses and Marcucci. Public transport costs 28 rubles.

In 2019 in Nevinnomyssk a new overpass was built, the length of the bridge is 1.1 kilometers, and the entire interchange reaches 3 kilometers. The overpass has four lanes for vehicles and two sidewalks, and it crosses five railway tracks, the largest overpass in the Stavropol territory. The overpass was built across the Nevinnomyssk-Pyatigorsk and Nevinnomyssk-Moscow railway, in the area of Stepnaya and Revolyutsionnaya streets. The opening took place on December 27, 2019.

Healthcare 
The network of medical institutions in the city is represented by 7 medical and preventive institutions.
 Nevinnomyssk city hospital Nevinnomyssk Dental clinic
 GBUZ SK Stavropol Regional clinical specialized psychiatric hospital N.1. 
 SK GBUZ "Regional clinical TB dispensary"" the Nevinnomyssk branch of the
 GKUZ SK "Children's regional sanatorium "Zhuravlik"
 Anmo "Stavropol regional clinical consulting and diagnostic center", In Nevinnomyssk branch
 NUZ "Nodal polyclinic at Stavropol station" of JSC "Russian Railways", 
 In 2019, on the basis of an order of the government of the Stavropol territory, 7 medical institutions of the city were reorganized by joining the state medical INSTITUTION "City hospital" of Nevinnomyssk (City hospital No. 2, Children's city hospital, city polyclinic No. 1, City polyclinic No. 2, ambulance Station, Nevinnomyssk city medical and rehabilitation center, Nevinnomyssk city medical and sports dispensary).

The structure of the institution is represented by five main divisions (polyclinic, hospital # 1, hospital # 2, Children's hospital, ambulance Station), including a skin and venereal dispensary, maternity hospital, women's consultation, as well as diagnostic, laboratory and other support services.

Currently, within the framework of the Federal program for healthcare modernization, capital and current repairs of buildings of medical institutions are being intensively carried out, and modern medical and household equipment is being purchased. As part of the Federal program to reduce mortality from cardiovascular diseases and provide timely, effective, affordable medical care to patients with impaired cerebral circulation and acute myocardial infarction, a primary vascular department was opened in the city hospital of Nevinnomyssk.

In addition, private clinics and centers operate In the city:

Near Nevinnomyssk in the villages of Kazminskoe and voronezhskoe there are healing thermal springs.

Sports 

 Olymp-arena sports and cultural complex. Built in the 90s of the XX century. After a large-scale reconstruction completed in 2019, Olymp-arena has become a modern sports complex in the South of Russia with infrastructure that allows hosting international competitions.
 Pool. Children's And Youth Sports School Record.
 The stadium NGGTI (formerly a Chemist).
 The stadium" Sports core (Vovkanych). Home stadium of the football team "Nevinnomyssk", until recently took part in the championship of the Stavropol territory. Due to lack of funds, the team was withdrawn from the SC championship and now competes in the kochubeyevsky district championship.
 Vesta children's soccer team. It is based in the building of Lyceum 6.

Status of the territory of advanced development 
Nevinnomyssk is a single-industry municipality of the Russian Federation with a stable socio-economic situation.

22 December 2017, in accordance with the Federal law "On territories of advancing socio-economic development of the Russian Federation", the Russian Government decided to establish within the company towns of the territory of advancing socio-economic development "Nevinnomyssk" with the aim of diversifying the economy, reducing dependence on core enterprises, increase of investment attractiveness of the city, the creation of new jobs, attracting investment.

At the end of 2018, nevinnomisk monotown entered the Top 10 leaders of the annual rating of monotowns. The rating comprehensively assesses the activity and efficiency of local governments, the level of development of SMEs, the urban economy and the urban environment. The annual rating of single-industry towns was formed for the first time as part of the implementation of the program "Integrated development of single-industry towns" (2016-2018).

 Industry

City-forming enterprises: JSC "Nevinnomysskiy Azot", JSC "Arnest" (opened on June 28, 1971, as Nevinnomysskiy plant of household chemicals released its first products on 26.03.1971). Also up to large enterprises are: Nevinnomyssk GRES branch of PJSC Enel Russia, branch of PJSC RusHydro-Cascade of Kuban hydroelectric power plants, plant of measuring devices Energomera (BRANCH of CJSC Electrotechnical plants»Energy meter).

As of July 11, 2020, 13 organizations have the status of a resident of TOSER:
 Kazminsky dairy plant-investment project LLC construction of a dairy plant with a capacity of 50 tons of raw milk per shift»;
 LLC "Eurodom" - investment project " Production of products from expanded polystyrene»;
 LLC "Remuniversal" - investment project " creation of production of replaceable tools for the production of aerosol cylinders»;
 LLC "Alomar" - the investment project "organization of import substitution production of high quality slugs on the territory of Stavropol region»;
 Aeroball LLC-investment project creation of a modern export-oriented production of aluminum cylinders;
 LLC " MOK" - investment project Organization of production of confectionery equipment and garden furniture in Nevinnomyssk;
 LLC "NKF — the investment project "Organization of production of confectionery products in Nevinnomyssk»;
 LLC "playgrounds" - investment project: Children's playgrounds;
 LLC "Stavropol Fruit Valley-investment project" Laying an intensive orchard on the territory of the Stavropol territory»;
 "Veles — the investment project" development of garment production in the city of Nevinnomyssk in Stavropol Krai»;
 LLC Golden shore investment project the creation of sports complex Gold coast in the city of Nevinnomyssk.
 Kondzelevicha factory Nevinnomyssk.
 Fruit storage in the city of Nevinnomyssk.
 Stol-SOFT company-provides for the organization of a new production of engineering means of protection of territories.
 Other enterprise
 Branch of PJSC RusHydro - Kuban HPP Cascade
 The branch Nevinnomyssk GRES OJSC Enel Russia
 ZIP "Energomera", BRANCH of CJSC "Electrotechnical factories" Energomera
 LLC "Gazprom transgaz Stavropol" Nevinnomysskaya LPUMG
 JSC reinforced Concrete"
 JSC Nevinnomyssk Уlectro-mechanical plant
 Nevinnomyssky bakery LLC
 Nevinnomyssk oil Extraction plant LLC
 Poultry Processing plant LLC.
 Regional Industrial Park
In 2010, the city created an Industrial Park with an area of 804.4 ha. The industrial Park is provided with all necessary communications (electricity, heat, gas, water and sanitation). As of January 1, 2020, 50% of the Park's territory has been developed.
As of 2020, 10 enterprises have the status of a resident of Rip:
 Stavstal LLC with the Stavstal Metallurgical plant investment project»;
 LLC "Terminal" with the investment project development and modernization of the logistics complex Terminal;
 LLC "Nevinnomyssky profile" with the investment project Production of roll-formed galvanized metal sections by cold forming;
 LLC "PC Stroymontazh Yug" with the investment project Complex for the production of dry building mixes;
 LLC Nevinnomysskiy radiator plant with the investment project Construction of Nevinnomysskiy radiator plant. On December 19, 2016, the first stage of the enterprise for the production of aluminum radiators was opened.
 ALP LLC with the investment project "first stage" production of magnesium products, phosphate-magnesium and soluble mineral fertilizers using environmentally friendly waste-free technologies»;
 EuroChem-Terminal Nevinnomyssk LLC with the investment project distribution center (HUB) of mineral fertilizers, seeds and plant protection products in Nevinnomyssk;
 Stavropol Fruit Valley LLC with the investment project Laying an intensive orchard on the territory of the Stavropol territory;
 Agro-Yug company LLC with the implementation of a large-scale investment project " construction of the first, second and third stages of a greenhouse complex for the production of protected soil fruits and vegetables, with an area of 60.7 hectares, located in the Stavropol territory near the city of Nevinnomyssk»;
 Kron LLC with the investment project "development of production of sandwich panels and shaped products".
 Nevinnomyssk hydrometallurgical plant LLC.

From the city begins Nevinnomysskiy canal.

Notes

Sources

External links
Official website of Nevinnomyssk 
Unofficial website of Nevinnomysk 
Popular website of Nevinnomyssk 
 Official website of Nevinnomyssk city Administration 
 City newspaper "Nevinnomyssky Rabochy" 
 information and investment portal of Nevinnomyssk 

1825 establishments in the Russian Empire
Cities and towns in Stavropol Krai
Populated places established in 1825